Andrea Rosso (born 27 July 1984) is an Italian football player who plays for GSD La Pianese.

Club career
He made his Serie C debut for Pro Vercelli on 14 September 2011 in a game against Como.

On 9 August 2019, Rosso joined GSD La Pianese.

References

External links
 

1984 births
Footballers from Turin
Living people
Italian footballers
Association football midfielders
F.C. Canavese players
A.S.D. Calcio Ivrea players
A.C. Rodengo Saiano players
A.C. Carpenedolo players
F.C. Pro Vercelli 1892 players
F.C. Pavia players
U.S. Cremonese players
A.C. Cuneo 1905 players
Serie B players
Serie C players
Serie D players
A.C. Sangiustese players